The Cauberg Cyclo-cross is a cyclo-cross race held in Valkenburg, Netherlands. This race is up and around the famous Cauberg, which is the final of the Amstel Gold Race. Former World Champion Adrie van der Poel designed the parcours and its variations. Since the 2013-2014 season it became a part of the UCI Cyclo-cross World Cup. In October 2017 there was no edition held, because the Cyclo-cross World Championships is on the same parcours in February 2018 (shown in the results in red).

Past Elite winners

Men

Women

Past Under 23 / Junior winners

Men Under23

Men Junioren (U19)

References 
 Women's World Cup 2013-2016 on The-Sports.org
 World Cup Elite Men 2013-2016
 World Cup Men Under 23 2013-2016
 World Cup Men Juniors 2013-2016
 Women's race 2011-2013
 Men's race 2011-2013 on The-Sports.org
 https://web.archive.org/web/20111020205511/http://www.caubergcyclocross.com/

UCI Cyclo-cross World Cup
Cycle races in the Netherlands
Cyclo-cross races
Recurring sporting events established in 2005
2005 establishments in the Netherlands
Cycling in Valkenburg aan de Geul